Fredrik Nils Ohlander (born 11 February 1976) is a Swedish handballer, currently playing as a goalkeeper for the Spanish club BM Granollers.

He has previously played for Danish Handball League side KIF Kolding and Spanish club FC Barcelona Handbol.

Ohlander has played 60 matches for the Swedish national handball team.

External links
 player info 

1976 births
Living people
Swedish male handball players
Liga ASOBAL players
Swedish expatriate sportspeople in Denmark
Swedish expatriate sportspeople in Spain
BM Granollers players
FC Barcelona Handbol players